The 2017 Auckland Open, also known by its sponsored name ASB Classic, was a joint 2017 ATP World Tour and 2017 WTA Tour tennis tournament, played on outdoor hard courts. It was the 32nd edition of the women's event, and the 41st edition of the men's event. It took place at the ASB Tennis Centre in Auckland, New Zealand, from 2 to 7 January 2017 for the women, and from 9 to 14 January 2017 for the men.

Points and prize money

Point distribution

Prize money 

1 Qualifiers' prize money is also the Round of 32 prize money
* per team

ATP singles main-draw entrants

Seeds 

1 Rankings as of January 2, 2017.

Other entrants 
The following players received wildcards into the singles main draw:
  Dustin Brown
  Artem Sitak
  Michael Venus

The following players received entry from the qualifying draw:
  Ryan Harrison
  Brydan Klein
  Michael Mmoh
  Finn Tearney

The following player received entry as a lucky loser:
  Jose Statham

Withdrawals 
Before the tournament
  Roberto Bautista Agut (stomach virus) → replaced by  Jose Statham
  Tommy Robredo → replaced by  Jérémy Chardy
  Juan Martín del Potro → replaced by  Lu Yen-hsun

ATP doubles main-draw entrants

Seeds 

1 Rankings as of January 2, 2017.

Other entrants 
The following pairs received wildcards into the doubles main draw:
  Marcus Daniell /  Marcelo Demoliner
  Jose Statham /  Finn Tearney

WTA singles main-draw entrants

Seeds 

1 Rankings as of December 26, 2016.

Other entrants 
The following players received wildcards into the singles main draw:
  Marina Erakovic
  Jade Lewis
  Antonia Lottner

The following players received entry from the qualifying draw:
  Mona Barthel
  Jamie Loeb
  Arina Rodionova
  Barbora Štefková

Withdrawals 
Before the tournament
  Ana Ivanovic (retirement) → replaced by  Varvara Lepchenko
  Sloane Stephens → replaced by  Naomi Broady

WTA doubles main-draw entrants

Seeds 

1 Rankings as of December 26, 2016.

Other entrants 
The following pairs received wildcards into the doubles main draw:
  Marina Erakovic /  Laura Robson
  Jade Lewis /  Erin Routliffe

Champions

Men's singles 

  Jack Sock def.  João Sousa, 6–3, 5–7, 6–3

Women's singles 

  Lauren Davis def.  Ana Konjuh, 6–3, 6–1

Men's doubles 

  Marcin Matkowski /  Aisam-ul-Haq Qureshi def.  Jonathan Erlich /  Scott Lipsky, 1–6, 6–2, [10–3]

Women's doubles 

  Kiki Bertens /  Johanna Larsson def.  Demi Schuurs /  Renata Voráčová, 6–2, 6–2

References

External links 
 

2017 ATP World Tour
2017 WTA Tour
2017
2017
ASB
January 2017 sports events in New Zealand
2017 in New Zealand tennis